Dry Creek is an unincorporated community and census-designated place (CDP) in Cherokee County, Oklahoma, United States. The population was 227 at the 2010 census.

Geography
Dry Creek is located in southeastern Cherokee County at  (35.751029, -94.882700), southeast of the head of Tenkiller Ferry Lake on the Illinois River. The CDP is bordered on the north and east by Dry Creek, an inlet to the lake; on the west by Oklahoma State Highway 82; and on the southwest by Elk Creek. Highway 82 leads north  to Tahlequah, the Cherokee County seat, and south  to Interstate 40 at Vian.

Demographics

As of the census of 2000, there were 216 people, 97 households, and 67 families residing in the CDP. The population density was 24.8 people per square mile (9.6/km2). There were 153 housing units at an average density of 17.6/sq mi (6.8/km2). The racial makeup of the CDP was 64.81% White, 0.93% African American, 30.56% Native American, and 3.70% from two or more races. Hispanic or Latino of any race were 1.85% of the population.

There were 97 households, out of which 20.6% had children under the age of 18 living with them, 54.6% were married couples living together, 9.3% had a female householder with no husband present, and 30.9% were non-families. 24.7% of all households were made up of individuals, and 17.5% had someone living alone who was 65 years of age or older. The average household size was 2.23 and the average family size was 2.54.

In the CDP, the population was spread out, with 19.9% under the age of 18, 6.9% from 18 to 24, 19.4% from 25 to 44, 26.4% from 45 to 64, and 27.3% who were 65 years of age or older. The median age was 51 years. For every 100 females, there were 87.8 males. For every 100 females age 18 and over, there were 88.0 males.

The median income for a household in the CDP was $27,292, and the median income for a family was $28,523. Males had a median income of $19,643 versus $22,083 for females. The per capita income for the CDP was $14,186. About 14.7% of families and 22.5% of the population were below the poverty line, including 48.8% of those under the age of eighteen and 8.9% of those 65 or over.

References

Census-designated places in Cherokee County, Oklahoma
Census-designated places in Oklahoma